Simonovskaya is a rural locality (a village) in Nizhnekuloyskoye Rural Settlement, Verkhovazhsky District, Vologda Oblast, Russia. The population was 18 as of 2002.

Geography 
Simonovskaya is located 33 km southeast of Verkhovazhye (the district's administrative centre) by road. Drugosimonovskaya is the nearest rural locality.

References 

Rural localities in Verkhovazhsky District